Since its inception the Baháʼí Faith has had involvement in socioeconomic development beginning by giving greater freedom to women, promulgating the promotion of female education as a priority concern, and that involvement was given practical expression by creating schools, agricultural coops, and clinics.

Current development activities worldwide are related to areas such as education, health, agriculture, arts and media, the local economy and the advancement of women. By 2017 there were an estimated 40,000 small-scale local projects, 1,400 sustained projects with administrative structure (e.g. schools, radio stations, gardens), and 135 Baháʼí-inspired development organizations (e.g. FUNDAEC, New Era High School).

Historical development
The accelerated growth of the worldwide community in the 1960s-1980s expanded it with a large number of poor, illiterate villagers and tribal peoples in India, Africa and South America, which meant an enormous challenge for the social and economic development of communities. According to the Baháʼí teachings, development should increase people's self-reliance, communal solidarity, giving access to knowledge, and, where possible, removing sources of injustice. Spiritual, moral and material development should be linked together. These priorities are envisioned as crucial to the development of world peace.

The religion entered a new phase of activity when a message of the Universal House of Justice dated 20 October 1983 was released. The Office of Social and Economic Development was established and Baháʼís were urged to seek out ways, compatible with the Baháʼí teachings, in which they could become involved in the social and economic development of the communities in which they lived. Worldwide in 1979 there were 129 officially recognized Baháʼí socioeconomic development projects. By 1987, the number of officially recognized development projects had increased to 1482.

In time with the release of the Universal House of Justice's release of its statement The Promise of World Peace, it also sent a letter of all national assemblies to specify goals for the community for the International Year of Peace. These goals included sponsoring activities about the theme of peace which is a priority of the religion: to engage the attention of people to relevant topics related to peace (often related matters of justice and development) and the unity of humanity.

Current situation
The Baháʼís around the world are currently being encouraged to focus on capacity building through activities such as spiritual education of children, a youth empowerment program, study circles, and devotional gatherings. For most of these activities, material developed by the Ruhi Institute is used. Initiatives of social action include activities in areas like health, sanitation, education, gender equality, arts and media, agriculture, and the environment. Educational projects include schools, which range from village tutorial schools to large secondary schools, and some universities.

Statistics
In November 1986, the Baha'i department of statistics released the following summary of projects accomplished:

In April 2018, the Baháʼí Office of Social and Economic Development released the following conservative estimates, based on provided by national Baháʼí institutions.

Some particular examples
 The Baháʼí International Community, an international non-governmental organization, maintains a presence devoted to supporting and coordinating socioeconomic development activities at the United Nations as well as presenting papers and reports of activities of the religion to UN agencies on themes of development and peace.

 Related to the International Year of Peace in 1986, public conferences and seminars were organized in several countries.
 Baháʼís and interested parties have participated in an annual conference since 1999 sponsored by the Rabbani Charitable Trust in Orlando Florida. Mildred Mottahedeh gave nearly all her wealth away by establishing charities such as the Mottahedeh Development Services. The Baháʼí Chair for World Peace is located at the Center for International Development and Conflict Management under the auspices of the College of Behavioral and Social Sciences at the University of Maryland.

List of Baháʼí-inspired organizations
Some larger scale examples are:
FUNDAEC, Colombia
New Era High School, India
Barli Development Institute for Rural Women, India
Banani International Secondary School, Zambia
Nur University, Bolivia
School of the Nations, Brazil
School of the Nations, Macau
Townshend International School, Czech Republic
Tahirih Justice Center, United States
Dawn Breakers International Film Festival, United States

See also
Baháʼí Faith and gender equality
Ruhi Institute
Baháʼí radio
Baháʼí school
Baháʼí Faith by country
Huqúqu'lláh
Urbain Ledoux
Baháʼí statistics

References

Further reading

 Baháʼí Office of Social and Economic Development (2018). For the Betterment of the World: The Worldwide Baháʼí Community's Approach to Social and Economic Development.

External links
Bahai.org: Social and Economic Development
A Widening Embrace (chapter 3; 2018 documentary film on bahai.org)
Institute for Studies in Global Prosperity (ISGP)
Baha'i-Inspired Charitable Agencies and Social and Economic Development Organizations
Photographs of Baháʼís alongside others, contributing to the betterment of society

Bahá'í practices
Economic development